Pam Chun is a writer and marketing consultant, most notable as the author of the book The Money Dragon.

Education 

Born and raised in Hawaii in a family of storytellers, Pam Chun attended Punahou, the University of Hawaii, and graduated with honors from the University of California, Berkeley.  Recent publications include works on Asian Pacific Americans and Hawaii.

Literary Achievements 

Pam has been interviewed and featured on National Public Radio, at the Smithsonian Institution in Washington, D.C., at the National Archives and Records Administration's Conference on Asian Americans and Pacific Islanders, and in the 2004 documentary, Hawaii's Chinatown, which premiered on Hawaii PBS.  Pam has been a speaker at Alameda's first Literary Festival for readers, San Francisco's first Litquake, the San Francisco Writer's Conference, the Bamboo Ridge Writer's Workshop, and many universities. Multi-page interviews of Pam and her publications appear in The San Francisco Chronicle, The Honolulu Advertiser, The Honolulu Star-Bulletin, the Seattle International Examiner, the South China News (China) and Alameda Magazine.  Reviews of her novels have appeared in national publications and internationally (Asia Review of Books and South China News).

THE MONEY DRAGON, Pam's first novel, named one of 2002's Best Books in Hawaii, topped the bestseller charts for months upon its hardback and paperback release.  In 2003, her novel received the Kapalapala Po`okela Award for excellence in literature from the Hawaii Book Publisher's Association.  THE MONEY DRAGON, a tale of Old Hawaii, is the saga of Pam's great-grandfather, Lau Ah Leong, one of the legends of Hawaii and founder of Honolulu's Chinatown who, despite his immense power and wealth, is not mentioned in any history of Hawaii or of the Chinese in Hawaii.  It is a tale of cultures, empowered women, the conflict of Hawaiian, Territorial, and Federal laws, and the power of love.  The anthology Honolulu Stories (2006) includes an excerpt from THE MONEY DRAGON.
 
Pam Chun's second novel, WHEN STRANGE GODS CALL, which expands on one of the scandals of her infamous family, focuses on the contemporary clash of cultures in Hawaii and received the 2005 Ka Palapala Po`okela Award for Excellence in literature.
	
Pam Chun's fourth novel THE PERFECT TEA THIEF was published in 2014.  Under the guise of an inexperienced plant hunter for the British Horticultural Society, a dour Scot named Robert Fortune steals China's secrets of tea production, a brazen act of industrial espionage that devastates China's 5,000-year-old civilization. The Perfect Tea Thief, about this little-known episode.  The Perfect Tea Thief is a tale of deceit and lies, in a country of tradition crumbling under the powers of industrialization in a clash of Empires.

Pam Chun is on the Executive Advisory Board for the University of San Francisco Center for the Pacific Rim, chair of its Women's Roundtable, recently on the Board of Directors for the California Alumni Association at the University of California, Berkeley, and has been an officer for 30 years on CAL's Chinese Chapter Board.  She is one of the veteran Storytellers at the Asian Art Museum of San Francisco.  Pam was honored as one of 2004's four Outstanding Overseas Chinese by the Chinese Consolidated Benevolent Association.  She served as a fiction judge for the 2007 and 2008 Kiriyama Prize for Pacific Rim Literature.

She lives in the San Francisco Bay Area with her husband, Transpac sailor Fred J. Joyce III.  She has one son, a U.S. diplomat stationed overseas.

Visit her on the web at www.pamchun.com

Career
Pam Chun has been a marketing consultant to high-tech and high biotech companies in the Bay Area, and an Asian audience development consultant to the Asian Art Museum of San Francisco and the University of California, Berkeley.  Recent publications include works on Asian Pacific Americans and Hawaii.

Her first novel, The Money Dragon,  for which she was awarded a California Gubernatorial Commendation, captured the true saga of her great-grandfather, Lau Ah Leong, the founder of Honolulu's Chinatown and his family of fives wives and ten sons in the colorful days of Old Hawai`i. During a fundraising trip to Hawaii for CAL with Chancellor Tien, Senator Hiram Fong told Chun that her great-grandfather, L. Ah Leong, had founded Honolulu's Chinatown and owned the largest retail business in the Hawaiian Islands. The resulting novel, The Money Dragon, quickly became a bestseller in HawaiiIt was named one of 2002's Best Books in Hawaii by the Honolulu Star-Bulletin and received a 2003 Ka Palapala Po`okela Honorable Mention from the Hawaii Book Publishers Association for excellence in the literature about Hawaii.

Her second novel, When Strange Gods Call, won the 2005 Ka Palapala Po`okela Award for Excellence in Literature.

Pam Chun has been featured on National Public Radio, at the Smithsonian Institution in Washington D.C., at the National Archives and Records Administration's Conference on Asian Americans and Pacific Islanders, and in the 2004 documentary, “Hawai`i’s Chinatown.”

Pam Chun is on the Executive Advisory board for the University of San Francisco Center for the Pacific Rim, chair of its Women's Roundtable, and a Storyteller for the Asian Art Museum of San Francisco.  She has been a fiction judge for the 2006 and 2007 Kiriyama book Prize. In 2004, Pam was named Outstanding Overseas Chinese by the Chinese Consolidated Benevolent Association

References

External links
Official Page of Pam Chun

Novelists from Hawaii
American writers of Chinese descent
American historical novelists
American marketing businesspeople
American salespeople
University of Hawaiʻi at Mānoa alumni
University of California, Berkeley alumni
Living people
Punahou School alumni
Year of birth missing (living people)
American women novelists
Women historical novelists
21st-century American women